Terrence Jones (born 8 November 2002) is a Bahamian sprinter from Grand Bahama where he attended Tabernacle Baptist Christian Academy. He now attends Texas Tech University.
He holds the Bahamian 200m Jr National Record with a 20.36 (+0.9 m/s) as well as the National Record and NCAA Indoor 60m record with a time of 6.45.

References

External links

2002 births
Living people
Bahamian male sprinters
People from Grand Bahama
People from Freeport, Bahamas
Texas Tech Red Raiders men's track and field athletes
Athletes (track and field) at the 2022 Commonwealth Games